Soummam – Abane Ramdane Airport , also known as Soummam Airport or Bejaia Airport, is an airport serving Béjaïa, a city in the Béjaïa Province of northern Algeria. The airport is named after Abane Ramdane (1920–1957) (since 1999 by presidential decree), an Algerian revolutionary and architect of the 1956 Congress of Soummam.

In 2008, the airport handled 52,681 passengers on domestic flights and 170,724 passengers on international flights. The airport offers more than 10 flights per week to Paris, France and some others to Lyon, France, and Marseille, France. There are daily domestic flights mainly to Algiers.

Airlines and destinations
The following airlines operate regular scheduled and charter flights at Bejaia Airport:

Statistics

References

External links
 Google Maps - Soummam
 Etablissement de Gestion de Services Aéroportuaires d’Alger (EGSA-Alger)
 
 

Airports in Algeria
Airports established in 1982
1982 establishments in Algeria
Buildings and structures in Béjaïa Province